"Stranded" is a song recorded by American musician and songwriter Dave Kerzner.  The single is Kerzner's debut as a solo artist from his album New World.  

The first track on the album New World, Stranded is a five-part rock opera that introduces the album's theme as well as an individual known as "The Traveler".  The Traveler moves through a future world with his experiences chronicled in Stranded as well as each song of the album.

At the time of its release in 2014, the full-length album-version of the single was available as a  downloadable EP in both MP3 and FLAC formats.  A video to accompany the single was released by Kerzner on YouTube as a lyric video feature in conjunction with the song's release on September 9, 2014.

Reviews
In its December 17, 2014, online review of "Stranded", The Prog Report noted the song's "obvious" influence from the band Pink Floyd and stated, "The opening of "Stranded" is haunting and commands attention...the quality of the production is evident."  The review further stated that the "vocal barrage" at the end of the track showed Kerzner's ability to "separate himself from simply a reincarnation of his influences."

Credits

Musicians
Dave Kerzner – lead vocals, keyboards, guitar, drum programming, sound design
Fernando Perdomo – guitar, bass
Nick D'Virgilio – drums 
Ana Cristina – vocals
Steve Hackett – guitar
Durga McBroom – vocals
Jason Scheff – vocals

Production
Dave Kerzner – Producer
Dave Kerzner, Tom Lord-Alge – Mixing and sound engineering

References

External links
Stranded (video feature) by Dave Kerzner on YouTube 

2014 songs
2014 singles